The 2013 U.S. Cellular 250 presented by the Enlist Weed Control System was the 20th stock car race of the 2013 NASCAR Nationwide Series and the second iteration of the event. The race was held on Saturday, August 3, 2013, in Newton, Iowa at Iowa Speedway, a 7⁄8 mile (1.4 km) permanent D-shaped oval racetrack. The race took the scheduled 250 laps to complete. At race's end, Brad Keselowski, driving for Penske Racing, would pull away on the final restart with 35 to go to win his 23rd NASCAR Nationwide Series win and his third win of the season. To fill out the podium, Sam Hornish Jr. of Penske Racing and Brian Vickers of Joe Gibbs Racing would finish second and third, respectively.

Background 

Iowa Speedway is a 7/8-mile (1.4 km) paved oval motor racing track in Newton, Iowa, United States, approximately 30 miles (48 km) east of Des Moines. The track was designed with influence from Rusty Wallace and patterned after Richmond Raceway, a short track where Wallace was very successful. It has over 25,000 permanent seats as well as a unique multi-tiered Recreational Vehicle viewing area along the backstretch.

Entry list 

 (R) denotes rookie driver.
 (i) denotes driver who is ineligible for series driver points.

Practice

First practice 
The first practice session was held on Friday, August 2, at 3:30 PM CST, and would last for an hour and 20 minutes.

Second and final practice 
The second and final practice session, sometimes referred to as Happy Hour, was held on Friday, August 2, at 6:00 PM CST, and would last for an hour and 20 minutes.

Qualifying 
Qualifying was held on Saturday, August 3, at 4:05 PM CST. Each driver would have two laps to set a fastest time; the fastest of the two would count as their official qualifying lap.

No drivers would fail to qualify.

Full qualifying results

Race results

Standings after the race 

Drivers' Championship standings

Note: Only the first 12 positions are included for the driver standings.

References 

2013 NASCAR Nationwide Series
NASCAR races at Iowa Speedway
August 2013 sports events in the United States
2013 in sports in Iowa